NHK World-Japan (formerly and also known simply as NHK World) is the international arm of the Japanese state-controlled public broadcaster NHK. Its services are aimed at the overseas market, similar to those offered by other national public-service broadcasters, such as the British BBC (BBC World Service, BBC World News, etc.), France 24, or the German DW. Contents are broadcast through shortwave radio, satellite, and cable operators throughout the world, as well as online and through its mobile apps. NHK World-Japan is also available on DirecTV channels 322 and 2049. It is headquartered in Tokyo.

NHK World-Japan currently provides three main broadcast services: an English-language current affairs TV channel of the same name, a multilingual radio service (NHK World Radio Japan), and a Japanese-language general/entertainment TV service (NHK World Premium). NHK World-Japan also makes most of its programming available through its website (either live or on demand). A Chinese version of the news TV channel, NHK华语视界 (NHK Huayu Shijie), which essentially provides news and select programs from NHK World-Japan in Mandarin dubbing and/or subtitles, was launched on January 15, 2019, and is only distributed online.

The branch was rebranded from its former name of NHK World in April 2018.

Television

NHK World TV (rolling news channel) 

NHK World TV  broadcasting services for North America and Europe in 1995. On April 1, 1998, then-called NHK World Television started broadcasting. Today's NHK World-Japan is a current affairs and cultural channel that broadcasts internationally via satellite and cable TV. Programming is produced in English only. It began as a news channel in February 2009. NHK World-Japan's free-to-air broadcasts have been available in HD by satellite since then.

NHK World-Japan HD currently broadcasts from Intelsat 19 166°E, 68.5°E, Astra 19.2°E, Hot Bird 13°E, 58°W, to SES S.A. 3 103°W.
Some of the shows are produced by production studio JIB TV, which is 60% owned by NHK with the remaining 40% owned by private investors like Microsoft and Japanese bank Mizuho. The NHK World-Japan DOG logo is not used at all when shows produced by JIB TV are aired as a paid programming.

Programs 
TV programs by NHK World-Japan include:

 Begin Japanology and Japanology Plus: A Japanese culture and lifestyle television show with Peter Barakan.
 Biz Stream: A weekly business news program featuring the main stories of the week with guest expert analysis.
 Cool Japan: Hosted by Shoji Kokami and Risa Stegmayer; some aspects of Japanese customs are considered "cool" by foreigners. Cool Japan is a television show that illustrates the quickly changing Japanese culture and how it is perceived by the international community that have recently made Japan their home.
 J-Melo: A music program hosted by May J., featuring the latest developments in Japanese music, selections of hit songs, and diverse material from a wide range of different music genres: pop, rock, jazz, and classical.
 NHK Newsline: A news program with updates every hour, covering world events and business-related news, as well as providing global weather forecasts.
 Somewhere Street: A travel program which explores a different city each episode, from a tourist's perspective walking through a city.
 Today's Close-up: A current affairs program from the NHK's domestic network

Most recently, NHK World-Japan has promoting selections of their J-drama lineups under NHK Drama Showcase.

NHK World Premium (entertainment channel) 

NHK World Premium broadcasts a mixture of news, sports and entertainment in Japanese language worldwide, via satellite and cable providers, as a subscription service mostly targeted at Japanese expatriates.

It is marketed with that very name in several regions of the world, including Asia, Oceania and Latin America. In Europe, NHK World Premium's contents are shown instead on JSTV-branded subscription channels run by NHK Cosmomedia Europe and headquartered in the UK. The service is known as テレビジャパン (TV Japan) in the US, which is run by NHK Cosmomedia America. Contents generally do not carry English subtitles.

Radio 

NHK World Radio Japan (RJ) is the international radio arm of NHK. It broadcasts a weekly lineup of news, current affairs, cultural, and educative radio program focusing on Japan and Asia, for a daily total of 65 hours of broadcasts.

Radio Japan provides two main feeds:

 The General Service broadcasts worldwide in Japanese and English.
 The Regional Service broadcasts to specific geographical zones in 17 languages: Arabic, Bengali, Burmese, Chinese, English, French, Hindi, Indonesian, Korean, Persian, Portuguese, Russian, Spanish, Swahili, Thai, Urdu, Vietnamese. Both services are available on shortwave (SW) as well as on the internet.

Radio Japan's shortwave relay stations 
NHK World Radio Japan runs a domestic SW relay station on 9750 kHz from 8:00 to 16:00 UTC:

 Yamata

It also leases some hours by several external relay stations for English service in:
 United Kingdom
 United Arab Emirates
 Uzbekistan 
 Myanmar  
 Madagascar 
 Vatican State - Vatican Radio
 France - Radio France Internationale

Satellite and internet service 
NHK World-Japan broadcasts via C-band and Ku-band satellites around the globe.

The programs and content are also available online.
 NHK World-Japan: online news (text) and live video stream of the rolling news channel
 NHK World Radio Japan: live radio streams, podcasts, and archive programming
 Learn Japanese: re-edited versions of series, such as Basic Japanese for You and Brush Up Your Japanese.
Only a limited number of programs are available online for free.
 NHK is available on Apple TV, Fire TV, and Roku streaming media players.

See also 
 Television in Japan
 International broadcasting in Japan
 International news channels

References

External links
 
 NHK World Premium
 NHK World-Japan on YouTube
 NHK World Radio Japan interval signal

24-hour television news channels in Japan
World
International broadcasters
Foreign television channels broadcasting in the United Kingdom
English-language television stations
State media    
Cable television in Hong Kong
Television channels and stations established in 1995
International Emmy Awards Current Affairs & News winners
HD-only channels